Labrisomus nuchipinnis, the hairy blenny, is a species of labrisomid blenny native to the Atlantic Ocean from the coast of the Americas to the African coast. This species prefers areas that give them crevices and holes to shelter in such as areas with rock or rubble substrates, reefs or beds of seagrass. Carnivorous, they prey on such animals as crustaceans, gastropods, echinoderms such as urchins and brittle stars, polychaete worms and other fishes. This species can reach a length of  TL. They can also be found in the aquarium trade.

Gallery

References

External links
 

nuchipinnis
Taxa named by Jean René Constant Quoy
Taxa named by Joseph Paul Gaimard
Fish described in 1824
Fish of the Atlantic Ocean